The Martens is a historic apartment building located at Indianapolis, Indiana.  It was built in 1900, and is a three-story, 19 bay wide, brick building.  It has commercial storefronts on the first floor with Classical Revival style cast iron pilaster posts and supporting "I" beam framing.  It features two-story projecting bays on the upper stories.

It was listed on the National Register of Historic Places in 1983.

References

Apartment buildings in Indiana
Residential buildings on the National Register of Historic Places in Indiana
Neoclassical architecture in Indiana
Residential buildings completed in 1900
Residential buildings in Indianapolis
National Register of Historic Places in Indianapolis